The 1972 NFL draft was held February 1–2, 1972, at the Essex House in New York City, New York. With the first overall pick of the draft, the Buffalo Bills selected defensive end Walt Patulski.

Player selections

Round one

Round two

Round three

Round four

Round five

Round six

Round seven

Round eight

Round nine

Round ten

Round eleven

Round twelve

Round thirteen

Round fourteen

Round fifteen

Round sixteen

Round seventeen

Hall of Famers
 Franco Harris, running back from Penn State, taken 1st round 13th overall by Pittsburgh Steelers
Inducted: Professional Football Hall of Fame class of 1990.
 Cliff Branch, wide receiver from Colorado, taken 4th round 98th overall by Oakland Raiders
Inducted: Professional Football Hall of Fame class of 2022 (posthumous).

Notable undrafted players

References

External links
 NFL.com – 1972 Draft
 databaseFootball.com – 1972 Draft
 Pro Football Hall of Fame 

National Football League Draft
NFL Draft
Draft
NFL Draft
NFL Draft
American football in New York City
1970s in Manhattan
Sporting events in New York City
Sports in Manhattan